Alone I Admire is the debut album from American dream pop band Auburn Lull, released on February 14, 1999 on Burnt Hair Records. The album was reissued by Darla Records in 2002.

Track listing 
"Stockard Drive" – 4:34
"Desert" – 3:23
"Old Mission" – 3:18
"Blur My Thoughts Again" – 4:50
"Early Evening Reverie" – 3:58
"The Last Beat" – 3:48
"Tidal" – 2:55
"Between Trains" – 5:37
"Finland Station" – 4:17
Untitled – 10:37

References

1999 albums
Auburn Lull albums
Ambient albums by American artists
Post-rock albums by American artists